FC Daugava was a Latvian football club, based at the Daugava Stadium, in the city of Daugavpils. They lastly played in the Latvian Second League in 2015. They were one of two clubs with the name Daugava and should not be confused with FK Daugava Rīga.

In 2008, they won the Latvian Cup. In 2012, they won their first ever Latvian Higher League championship.

History 

The club was founded in 1944.

They started the 1992 season with a young team, but later some experienced players were added to the squad and Ditton managed to regain a place in the higher league. In 2006 Ditton were taken over by new investors. Ukrainian manager Sergei Yuran was invited to join the team staff, but he was soon replaced by Sergei Kiriakov. That season the club achieved their highest position to that point, finishing 5th in the championship.

At the end of 2006, Russian businessman Igor Malishkov became the main shareholder in the club. It was his decision to change the club's name to FC Daugava. Meanwhile, he also created a plan to develop the infrastructure of the club and build a new stadium. Malishkov invited Sergei Petrenko, who was then famous for his success with Torpedo Moscow, to become the manager of the team. Petrenko left in May 2007 for family reasons. In June 2007 Igor Gamula was appointed, but he only started managing the team in August 2008. Till then the incumbent manager was Mihails Zemļinskis.

On 19 July 2008 the Daugava Stadium was officially opened. That year the club won the Latvian Cup for the first time in its history. On 8 February 2009, due to financial problems, FC Daugava merged with Dinaburg and formed one team under the name of Dinaburg for the 2009 season. That season Dinaburg were relegated from the Latvian Higher League due to suspicions of participation in match fixing. Daugava then decided to create a team that would play in the Latvian First League the following season, meanwhile Dinaburg ended its existence, stating that the club's image was spoiled. As Daugavpils is one of the biggest cities in Latvia, the LFF came up with a proposal to offer Daugava a place in the Latvian Higher League. The offer was accepted and Daugava were given a chance to represent Daugavpils in the higher league in the 2010 season.

In 2011, the club achieved its best result until then, finishing third in the championship. In 2012 Daugava became the champions of the Latvian Higher League for the first time in the club's history.

Match-fixing scandal 

In July 2013 Federbet organization expressed its concerns in regards to possible match fixing attempts concerning Daugava's UEFA Champions League game against IF Elfsborg, which the club lost 7–1, with 7 goals being scored in the second half. Prior to the 2014 Latvian Higher League season Daugava was initially denied the participation license due to non-existing youth academy but it was later obtained in exchange of promises to develop one in the near future. In October 2014, during a spot-check at the club, several of its members were interrogated, with the club's former president Oleg Gavrilov being arrested for money laundering, legalization of illegal earnings and other crimes, including ignorance of the previously imposed disqualification upon him from any activates affiliated with Latvian football. Four other people, including the club's technical director, manager and two players were disqualified for an indeterminate period of time until the end of the investigation. The investigation is currently still in progress and is lead in cooperation of the Latvian Football Federation, UEFA and the State Police of Latvia.

Logo 

FC Daugava are currently using a logo based on the design of the legendary Latvian football club FK Daugava Rīga that was founded in 1944 and played in the Soviet Top League.

Honours 

 Virsliga
 2012
 Latvian Cup
 2008
 Latvian Supercup
 2013
 Virslīga Winter Cup
 2013

Participation in Latvian Championships 

Notes
1 Season in the Latvian Second League

2 Season in the Latvian First League

European Record

Sponsors

Managers 

 Sergei Yuran (1 Jan 2006 – 28 July 2006)
 Sergei Kiriakov (June 2006 – Sept 2006)
 Sergei Petrenko (1 Dec 2006 – 25 May 2007)
 Igor Kichigin (Sept 2006 – Dec 2006)
 Igor Gamula (June 2007 – Nov 2007)
 Mihails Zemļinskis (Nov 2007 – Aug 2008)
 Igor Gamula (Aug 2008 – June 2009)
 Kirils Kurbatovs (June 2009 – Dec 2009)
 Sergejs Pogodins (Jan 2010 – Feb 2010)
 Tamaz Pertia (interim) (1 Feb 2010 – 31 Jan 2011)
 Aleksandr Laptev (Feb 2010)
 Sergejs Pogodins (Feb 2010 – June 2010)
 Tamaz Pertia (2 July 2010 – 30 June 2011)
 Leonid Nazarenko (July 2011 – Dec 2011)
 Ravil Sabitov (22 Dec 2011 – 1 May 2012)
 Ivan Tabanov (1 July 2012 – Nov 2013)
 Viktor Demidov (1 Jan 2014 – June 2014)
 Hennadiy Orbu (4 June 2014 – Aug 2014)
 Ivan Tabanov (8 Aug 2014 – Oct 2014)

References

External links 

Official webite 
Profile at uefa.com

 
Football clubs in Latvia
Association football clubs established in 1944
1944 establishments in Latvia
Association football clubs disestablished in 2015
2015 disestablishments in Latvia
Sport in Daugavpils